Nefedovskaya is a rural locality (a village) in Tiginskoye Rural Settlement, Vozhegodsky District, Vologda Oblast, Russia. The population was 54 as of 2002.

Geography 
The distance to Vozhega is 36 km, to Gridino is 12 km. Bukhara, Ogarkovskaya, Antsiferovskaya are the nearest rural localities.

References 

Rural localities in Vozhegodsky District